Thuppakki Munai is a 2018 Indian Tamil-language action thriller film directed by Dinesh Selvaraj and produced by S. Thanu under his production banner V. Creations. The film stars Vikram Prabhu and Hansika Motwani. Music is composed by L. V. Muthu Ganesh and film edited by Bhuvan Srinivasan. The film released on 14 December 2018.

Plot
ACP Birla Bose IPS (Vikram Prabhu) is a straightforward cop and ruthless encounter specialist from the Mumbai Police Department. Though he has an exceptional record of encounters and strives hard to keep the city crime-free, he gets into trouble with the human rights commission because of his ruthlessness in handling criminals. On one such occasion, Bose is suspended, and this leads to a rift between him and his mother. He also breaks up with his girlfriend Mythili Mohan (Hansika Motwani) because her father (Aadukalam Naren) accuses him of being unstable in his career and personal life.

Bose gets an order from his senior officer and travels to Rameshwaram to investigate the brutal rape and murder of a 15-year-old girl named Manjalnayaki (Abhirami). Bose finds out that the local police has arrested a Bihari Maoist named Aazad (RJ Sha) in connection to the crime. They believe that Bose, an encounter specialist, should kill Aazad after making him confess to the crime. Uyyavandhan (M. S. Bhaskar), Manjal's father, meets Bose and narrates his version of the story. He is the town's famous barber and extends his services to Brahmaraja (Vela Ramamoorthy), a businessman who is feared and revered all over the island. On one such fateful day, when Uyya is providing his barber services to Brahmaraja at his house, Brahmaraja's son and his friends lust after Manjal, who is playing in their premises. The next day, Uyya is thrown off the road from his bike when a car speeds past him. He sees a ribbon flying out of the window at the time. Soon, he finds that Manjal is missing, and a search team is dispatched, but they find only her corpse floating in the sea. Uyya is devastated and tries to piece up information like the flying ribbon, and a piece of Manjal's science project found from the same car and realizes that Brahmaraja's son and his friends are the perpetrators.

After confirming that Uyya is telling the truth and conducting further investigations about Aazad. Bose finds that he is innocent and a former Naxal who had come to Tamilnadu to seek a reformed life and that the local police have framed him just to close the case. However, with the mounting media, public attention and protests, it is not easy for the police department to release Aazad and find the actual perpetrators. While the police department is still contemplating, Brahmaraja, who is in New Delhi, learns of the entire situation and wants to divert the attention back to Aazad so that his son will not be accused. He sends his nephew Ganga (Bharath Reddy) and henchmen to beat up and kill Aazad and Bose, who is helping him.

Since Mythili works for the Prime Minister's office, Bose seeks her help in obtaining a habeas corpus order from the PM's office for Aazad. It states that all the police the state must hand over Aazad alive to the Chennai supreme court and a tight police security has to be given for Bose and Aazad. Ganga and his henchmen find out about this and try to sabotage Bose's plan and kill Aazad before he reaches the court, but Bose tricks them and makes Aazad escape in disguise and fights Ganga and his men. Unfortunately, before Bose could escape, Brahmaraja finds him. Meanwhile, Uyya, under Bose's instructions, secretly goes to the hideout of Brahmaraja's son in Chennai and his friends to kill them to avenge Manjal's death. Bose makes Brahmaraja watch the video of Uyya killing his son. Unable to take it all anymore, Brahmaraja is frustrated at his inability and kills himself.

Aazad successfully reaches the Madurai branch of the Chennai High Court and seeks custody. Finally, it is revealed that Uyya actually does not kill his daughter's killers for revenge. He decides to be human and forgives them, and makes them confess to their crime to the media and police. The four criminals are then arrested. Aazad is freed and goes back to live a peaceful life, thanks to Bose's decision to be human.

Cast

 Vikram Prabhu as ACP Birla Bose, a straightforward cop and ruthless encounter specialist.
 Hansika Motwani as Mythili Mohan, Bose's girlfriend who works at the PM's Office.
 Vela Ramamoorthy as Brahmaraja, a businessman who is feared and revered all over the country.
 M. S. Bhaskar as Uyyavandhan, Manjal's father and the town's barber who extends his services to Brahmaraja.
 RJ Sha as Aazad, a former Bihari Maoist who was wrongly accused of raping and murdering Manjal.
 Ammu Abhirami as Manjalnayaki, a 15-year-old girl who was raped and murdered by Brahmaraja's son and his friends.
 Aadukalam Naren as Mohan, Mythili's father.
 Bharath Reddy as Ganga, Brahmaraja's nephew who was sent to kill Aazad and Bose.
 Kalyani Natarajan as Bose's mother
 Vincent Asokan as Assistant Commissioner Rao
 G. Marimuthu as Police Inspector
 Sangili Murugan as Hotel Owner
 Cheranraj as Police Inspector Prince
 Sai Dheena as Brahmaraja's henchman
 Dhilsa as Henchman

Production
The film was launched in December 2017. The film's teaser was released by Gautham Menon in September 2018.

Soundtrack
Soundtrack has only two songs was composed by brothers L. V. Ganesh and L. V. Muthukumarasamy [ Sons of Great legend L. Vaidyanathan].
Yaar Ivan - LV Muthu, Karthi
Poovendru - Sriram Parthasarathy

Reception
News Minute wrote that the film is "unpredictable" and "fails to connect". Sify wrote, "The plot and the circumstances are cliched and gives you a sense of deja vu, but it is the slick packaging and presentation that makes Thuppakki Munai an engrossing watch." Firstpost wrote: "On the whole, Thuppakki Munai is edgy and new in treatment, and watchable to a smaller extent." Times of India wrote "It all sounds exciting on paper, but the execution onscreen doesn't quite match what we expect from a film in this genre. The tone keeps veering between gritty action and full-blown melodrama [..], and this robs the film of intensity." Film Companion South wrote, "This film seems as if the director set about trying to prove me wrong on every count. Even the craft is missing. The overall crudeness (wait till you get to the ugly "touch" involving a candle) made me wish for... aggressively showy filmmaking. At least, you can get off on the frames.".

References

External links 
 Review by Chennaivision

2018 films
2010s Tamil-language films
Indian action thriller films
2018 action thriller films